Kani Ganji (also Romanized as Kānī Ganjī; also known as Ganjī, Kān Ganjī, and Kānī Ganjeh) is a village in Panjeh Ali Rural District, in the Central District of Qorveh County, Kurdistan Province, Iran. At the 2006 census, its population was 584, in 143 families. The village is populated by Kurds.

References 

Towns and villages in Qorveh County
Kurdish settlements in Kurdistan Province